Clarence Hardy "C." Sharpe (May 5, 1931, St. Louis - January 28, 1990, New York City) was an American jazz saxophonist.

Sharpe's stepfather, Nathaniel, was a saxophonist in Fletcher Henderson's orchestra, and his father was big band vocalist Benjamin Hardy. He was raised in Germantown, Pennsylvania, where he led a student band as a high schooler called "C Sharpe and the Flats". He started his professional career in and around Philadelphia, where he played with Jimmy Garrison, Cal Massey, Lee Morgan, and McCoy Tyner. After relocating to New York City, he worked with Jimmy McGriff, Steve Ellington, Kenny Dorham, Joe Henderson, and Archie Shepp over the course of the 1960s. After leaving music for a period, he returned in the 1980s, playing with the Jazz Disciples in 1983, with Freddie Redd in 1985 and Ari Roland in 1987, and with his own group late in the decade. His sidemen for this ensemble were Frank Hewitt, Leroy Williams, and Hal Dotson. A photo of Clarence Hardy "C." Sharpe, while playing the saxophone, was collected by Pannonica de Koenigswarter, member of the Rothschild family.

He died at Goldwater Memorial Hospital on Roosevelt Island in New York City at the age of 58, having recently undergone surgery for throat cancer.

Discography
 Lee Morgan, Lee Morgan Indeed!  (Blue Note, 1957)
 Freddie Redd, Lonely City (Uptown, 1989)
 Archie Shepp, For Losers (ABC Impulse!, 1970)
 Archie Shepp, Kwanza (Impulse!, 1974)

References

American jazz saxophonists
Jazz musicians from Pennsylvania
Musicians from St. Louis
Jazz musicians from Missouri
20th-century American saxophonists
American male saxophonists
1931 births
1990 deaths
20th-century American male musicians
American male jazz musicians